Rzeszów Główny (Polish for Rzeszów Main station) is a railway station of the southeastern Polish city of Rzeszów, and the biggest of the Subcarpathian Voivodeship. According to the classification of passenger stations in Poland, it belongs to Class B.

The first station in Rzeszów was built in 1858 on the newly constructed line of the Galician Railway of Archduke Charles Louis from Kraków which eventually reached Lwów in 1861. The station was initially supposed to be located further outside the town to the north in the village of Zaczernie, however ultimately it was placed just north of the town square, creating a u-shaped bend on the railway.

In subsequent years, Rzeszów became an important railway junction, with additional connections to Jasło (southbound), and Tarnobrzeg's district of Ocice (northbound). During World War I, the station was destroyed by the retreating Russian Imperial troops. Rebuilt in the interbellum, it was destroyed again in 1944 by the Wehrmacht. The current complex was built after 1945.

Since 2018 the station platforms are undergoing an upgrade, scheduled to be completed in 2021.

The station offers connections to all major cities of Poland, also to Kyiv and Lviv.

Train services
The station is served by the following service(s):

EuroCity services (EC) (EC 95 by DB) (IC by PKP) Berlin - Frankfurt (Oder) - Rzepin - Wrocław – Katowice – Kraków – Rzeszów – Przemyśl
Express Intercity Premium services (EIP) Gdynia- Warsaw - Kraków - Rzeszów
Intercity services (IC) Zielona Góra - Wrocław - Opele - Częstochowa - Kraków - Rzeszów - Przemyśl
Intercity services (IC) Ustka - Koszalin - Poznań - Wrocław - Katowice - Kraków - Rzeszów - Przemyśl
Regional services (PR) Tarnów - Dębica - Rzeszów
Regional services (PR) Kraków - Bochnia - Tarnów - Dębica - Rzeszów
Regional services (PR) Tarnów - Dębica - Rzeszów - Jarosław - Przemyśl
Regional services (PR) Rzeszów - Kolbuszowa - Stalowa Wola Południe
Regional services (PR) Rzeszów - Kolbuszowa - Stalowa Wola Południe - Lublin
Regional services (PR) Rzeszów - Strzyżów nad Wisłokiem - Jasło
Regional services (PR) Rzeszów - Łańcut - Przeworsk
Regional services (PR) Rzeszów - Łańcut - Przeworsk - Jarosław - Przemyśl
Regional services (PR) Rzeszów - Łańcut - Przeworsk - Jarosław - Przemyśl - Medyka
Regional services (PR) Rzeszów - Łańcut - Przeworsk - Jarosław - Horyniec-Zdrój
Regional services (PKA) Rzeszów - Dębica 
Regional services (PKA) Rzeszów - Kolbuszowa
Regional services (PKA) Rzeszów - Strzyżów nad Wisłokiem
Regional services (PKA) Rzeszów - Łańcut - Przeworsk

References

External links
 

Railway stations in Poland opened in 1858
Railway stations in Podkarpackie Voivodeship
Buildings and structures in Rzeszów
Railway stations served by Przewozy Regionalne InterRegio